Best of the Beach Boys is the first compilation album released by American rock band the Beach Boys through Capitol Records in 1966. The first version was released in the United States on July 5, 1966, two months after Pet Sounds. Another version of Best of The Beach Boys was issued in the United Kingdom on November 11, 1966, with a track listing that differed from the American release.

North American release
The American release of Best of The Beach Boys includes a selection of 12 songs the band had recorded from 1963 to 1965, many of them singles or B-sides. The album reached number eight on the US charts and was certified gold by the RIAA on April 12, 1967, and double platinum on December 1, 1991. Best of The Beach Boys is currently out of print.

Stereo versions of the album are labeled Duophonic on the small print and the labels, though many tracks use true stereo mixes where available.

Track listing

British release

The British version of Best of The Beach Boys was released with songs that differed to its American counterpart. This version, initially compiled as a DJ sampler by EMI, sold close to 200,000 copies by September 1967 and spent a total of 142 weeks on the UK album charts, peaking at number two.

Track listing
Side A
"Surfin' Safari" (B. Wilson/Love) – 2:05
"Surfin' U.S.A." (B. Wilson/Berry) – 2:28
"Little Deuce Coupe" (B. Wilson/Love) – 1:50
"Fun, Fun, Fun" (B. Wilson/Love) – 2:18
"I Get Around" (B. Wilson/Love) – 2:12
"All Summer Long" (B. Wilson/Love) – 2:05
"In My Room" (B. Wilson/Usher) – 2:13
Side B
"Do You Wanna Dance?" (Bobby Freeman) – 2:18
"Help Me, Rhonda" (B. Wilson/Love) – 2:45
"California Girls" (B. Wilson/Love) – 2:37
"Barbara Ann" (Fred Fassert) – 2:05
"You're So Good to Me" (B. Wilson/Love) – 2:13
"Sloop John B" (trad. arr. B. Wilson/Al Jardine) – 2:55
"God Only Knows" (B. Wilson/Tony Asher) – 2:49

See also
List of albums which have spent the most weeks on the UK Albums Chart

References

 The Nearest Faraway Place: Brian Wilson, The Beach Boys and the Southern California Experience, Timothy White, c. 1994.

1966 greatest hits albums
Albums produced by Brian Wilson
Capitol Records compilation albums
The Beach Boys compilation albums